Frederick Green (1926-2006), was a male athlete who competed for England and 3 miles world record holder.

Athletics career
He represented England and won a silver medal in the 3 miles at the 1954 British Empire and Commonwealth Games in Vancouver, Canada.

In 1954 he defeated Christopher Chataway in the 1954 AAA Championships at White City and broke the three miles world record held by Gunder Hägg by recording 13 minutes 32.2 sec; Chataway's time was also under the world record.

References

1926 births
2006 deaths
English male long-distance runners
Athletes (track and field) at the 1954 British Empire and Commonwealth Games
Commonwealth Games medallists in athletics
Commonwealth Games silver medallists for England
Medallists at the 1954 British Empire and Commonwealth Games